Surja Dighal Bari (The Ominous House) is a 1979 Bangladeshi feature film directed and produced by Sheikh Niamat Ali and Masihuddin Shaker. The screenplay was based on Abu Ishaque's 1955 novel of the same title. It was the first film made from the Government of Bangladesh grant. The film was first released in a theater in Natore.

The film won Bangladesh National Film Award in 7 categories including Best Film, Best Director, Best Screenplay and Best Actress. It also won five international awards, including Mannheim Film Festival and Portugal Film Society.

Cast
 Dolly Anwar as Jaigun
 Rawshan Jamil as Shafi's mother
 Sitara Begum as Lalu's Mother
 ATM Shamsuzzaman as Jobed Fakir
 Elora Gohor as Maymun

Response 
Film critic Ahmed Muztaba Zamal, writing in Cinemaya in 2000, named Surja Dighal Bari as one of the top twelve films from Bangladesh. Writing in 2010, scholar of Asian cinema Zakir Hossain Raju called it "one of the best films ever made in Bangladesh".

Awards

Bangladesh National Film Awards
 Best Film
 Best Director
 Best Actress
 Best Screenplay
 Best Cinematography
 Best Editing
 Best Child Artist
 Best Child Artist (special)

References

External links
 

Bengali-language Bangladeshi films
1970s Bengali-language films
Best Film Bachsas Award winners
Best Film National Film Award (Bangladesh) winners
Films whose writer won the Best Screenplay National Film Award (Bangladesh)
Government of Bangladesh grants films